Milton Lewis, nicknamed "Red", was a Negro league second baseman in the 1920s.

Lewis made his Negro leagues debut in 1922, spending time with the Richmond Giants, Harrisburg Giants and Bacharach Giants. He stayed with the Bacharach Giants until his release in April 1925.

After spending time with the Wilmington Potomacs in 1925, he returned to the Bacharach Giants in 1926 and knocked a home run and eight hits for the club in their 1927 Colored World Series loss to the Chicago American Giants. Lewis finished his career in 1928 with the Lincoln Giants.

References

External links
 and Baseball-Reference Black Baseball stats and Seamheads

Place of birth missing
Place of death missing
Year of birth missing
Year of death missing
Bacharach Giants players
Harrisburg Giants players
Lincoln Giants players
Wilmington Potomacs players
Baseball second basemen